The Hague Journal of Diplomacy (HJD) is a peer-reviewed academic journal published quarterly. HJD publishes research on the theory, practice, processes and outcomes of diplomacy in both its traditional state-based forms, as well as contemporary diplomatic expressions practiced by states and non-state entities. Prof. Jan Melissen (Leiden University and University of Antwerp) and Prof. Paul Sharp (University of Minnesota, Duluth) are the journal's founding co-editors. Dr. Constance Duncombe (Monash University) and Dr. Marcus Holmes (The College of William & Mary) are Associate editors. Founded in 2005, HJD published its inaugural issue in January 2006. The journal is published by Brill/Nijhoff

Online presence/online editions 
HJD’s online platform covers additional content, such as blogs, articles, videos, podcasts and other news.

In 2019, HJD launched its blog with Ilan Manor (University of Oxford) as the editor. The Hague Diplomacy Blog intends to stimulate debate on the diplomatic aspect of international politics

In 2020, HJD started its podcast series. It aims at bringing the themes of the journal’s research off the page, and onto the discussion table. Each episode features a guest who will share their insights as researcher or practitioner of diplomacy

HJD has a presence in social media platforms of Twitter and LinkedIn.

Abstracting and indexing 
HJD is abstracted and indexed in:

Current abstracts 
ESCI (Emerging Sources Citation Index)
ERIH PLUS 
International Bibliography of the Social Sciences, Core 
PAIS International (Public Affairs Information Service), Selective Politics Collection 
Political Science Complete 
SCOPUS 
Social Science Premium Collection 
TOC Premier (Table of Contents) 
Worldwide Political Science Abstracts, Core

References

External links 
The journal’s website (Leiden University) 
Archive (Brill)

English-language journals
Political science journals
Quarterly journals
Publications established in 2006
Brill Publishers academic journals